Dirk Müller (born 25 October 1968) is a German stock trader, fund manager and author. He is internationally known as Mr. DAX and Dirk of the DAX, because his workplace was located right under the display of the DAX at the Frankfurt Stock Exchange. Journalists have used his facial expressions to depict the state of the market. In 2015, he founded a stock fund, Dirk Müller Premium Aktien.

Life 
Born in Frankfurt, Müller grew up in Reilingen, Rhein-Neckar-Kreis, where he still lives. He passed the Abitur at the Carl-Friedrich-Gauß-Gymnasium in Hockenheim, and then began training as a bank teller and financial assistant at Deutsche Bank in Mannheim.

In 1993, Müller passed the Börsenhändlerprüfung exam. He then worked until 1997 as a broker for Finacor-Rabe & Partner, then for a year for Cantor Fitzgerald International, and from 1998 to 2008 as official stock trader at the Frankfurt Stock Exchange for ICF AG.

In 2008, Müller moved to the company Wertpapierhandelsbank mwb fairtrade AG, where he worked until 2010. Since 2009, he has been the owner and managing director of Finanzethos GmbH, a company running the cashkurs.com website.

Müller published his first book, Crashkurs, in 2009, written in response to the financial crisis of 2007–2008. The successful publication made him well-known. His second book, Cashkurs, was published in 2011 and soon became a bestseller, number 1 on the list of Der Spiegel.

Müller was one of eight experts in a committee meeting of the German parliament Deutscher Bundestag on 27 June 2011, aiming at preventing speculation with agricultural raw materials ("Spekulation mit agrarischen Rohstoffen verhindern").

On 17 April 2015, Müller began his own stock fund, Dirk Müller Premium Aktien. While the fund lost 7% over the first year, it fared better than the DAX during the same time, which lost 16%. However, as of end of May 2021, the fund has lost 8.8% since inception, while the DAX index has gained 28.9%, resulting in an underperformance of 37.7% in seven years.

Müller is married, and the couple has a son.

Publications

Print media

Audio media 
 Crashkurs. , Berlin, 2009, . (3 CDs, 229 min.)

References

External links 

 
 
 Dirk Müller Premium Aktien Fond
 Interview Aktienkultur – Das Magazin der BVH-Börsenvereine January 2008

German stock traders
Businesspeople from Frankfurt
German economists
1968 births
Living people